Methodism is a Protestant Christian movement encompassing numerous denominations.

Methodism or Methodist may also refer to:

Methodism (philosophy), an approach in philosophy 
Methodic school, an ancient Greek school of medicine, referred to as Methodism 
Methodist Hospital, the name of numerous medical institutions

See also 

 
 Methodology
 Method acting, acting technique where actors draw on real life emotions
 List of Methodist denominations
 List of Methodist churches
 Methodist Church (disambiguation)
 Method (disambiguation)